Franklin County School District is a school district in Franklin County, Alabama, headquartered in Russellville.

Schools

High Schools
 Belgreen High School
 Franklin County Career Technical Center
 Phil Campbell High School
 Red Bay High School
 Tharptown High School
 Vina High School

Middle Schools
 East Franklin Junior High School

Elementary Schools
 Phil Campbell Elementary School
 Red Bay Elementary School
 Tharptown Elementary School

References

External links
 

School districts in Alabama